Edward M. Wright (January 13, 1932 – August 28, 1982) was an American professional wrestler who became popular in the late 1950s and 1960s. Despite racial tension in the United States, he became wildly popular as a babyface. Wrestling in either singles competition or in tag team competition (often matched with Bobo Brazil), thousands of fans would pack arenas to see him. He was the son of boxer Ed "Bearcat" Wright, and had an 8–0 record as a professional boxer himself in the early 1950s, boxing as "Bearcat Wright Jr."

Professional wrestling career 
The Arizona Wrestling Legends website says, "He was seen in Australia, in Canada, throughout the south, in the midwest, in Texas, always winning the support of the fans as he battled the likes of The Sheik, Johnny Valentine and Kinji Shibuya. A tall and lanky man, he was usually noted for flying dropkicks, spin kicks, and leaps off the rope." He adopted a "claw hold" for his finisher and was famous for desegregating wrestling.

Wright declared before an audience in Gary, Indiana, that he would no longer participate in segregated wrestling. Although suspended for a short time by the Indiana State Athletic Commission for his stand, shortly afterwards professional boxing desegregated. Bearcat Wright defeated Killer Kowalski in April 1961 to win the Big Time Pro Wrestling title and become, in effect, the world heavyweight wrestling champion.

Five days before Martin Luther King Jr. delivered his famous "I have a dream" speech in Washington, D.C., Wright won the WWA World Heavyweight Championship from "Classy" Freddie Blassie in Los Angeles, California. Known for behemoth strength (he would rip phone books in half during promotional interviews for his matches) he also was blackballed by Worldwide Wrestling Associates for refusing to drop the WWA championship to Edouard Carpentier and then back to Fred Blassie on December 13, 1963. He is one of the few wrestlers who legitimately would not drop their title—and so WWA had Gene LeBell (a known judo champion and shooter—or one who knew how to legitimately wrestle to defend themselves if needed) to substitute for Blassie at a rematch. When Wright refused to enter the ring, WWA stripped him of his title and awarded it to Carpentier.

Although Wright created controversy, promoters soon forgot about his negative sides. Wright continued to draw money and wrestled even into the 1970s.

On March 31, 2017, Wright was posthumously inducted into the WWE Hall of Fame as a part of the Legacy wing.

Death
Wright died at the age of 50 on August 28, 1982 from sickle cell anemia complications.

Championships and accomplishments 
 50th State Big Time Wrestling
 NWA Hawaii Tag Team Championship (2 times) – with Luther Lindsay and Sam Steamboat
 Big Time Wrestling (Boston)
 BTW Heavyweight Championship (1 time)
 Big Time Wrestling (San Francisco)
 NWA United States Championship (San Francisco version) (2 times)
 Championship Wrestling from Florida
 NWA Brass Knuckles Championship (Florida version) (1 time)
 NWA Florida Tag Team Championship (1 time) – with Bobby Shane
 Midwest Wrestling Association
 MWA Ohio Heavyweight Championship (1 time)
 NWA All-Star Wrestling
 NWA Canadian Tag Team Championship (Vancouver version) (1 time) – with Enrique Torres
 NWA Pacific Coast Tag Team Championship (Vancouver version) (1 time) – with Whipper Billy Watson
 Pacific Northwest Wrestling
 NWA Pacific Northwest Tag Team Championship (3 times) – with Shag Thomas (2) and Billy White Wolf
 World Championship Wrestling (Australia)
 IWA World Heavyweight Championship (2 times)
 IWA World Tag Team Championship (1 time) – with Mark Lewin
 Worldwide Wrestling Associates
 WWA World Heavyweight Championship (1 time)
 WWA International Television Tag Team Championship (1 time) – Mr. Moto
 WWE
 WWE Hall of Fame (Class of 2017)
 Wrestling Observer Newsletter
 Wrestling Observer Newsletter Hall of Fame (Class of 2019)
 Other titles:
 Arizona Heavyweight Championship (1 time)
 World Negro Heavyweight Championship (1 time)

References

External links 

 
 

1932 births
1982 deaths
20th-century African-American sportspeople
20th-century American male actors
African-American male professional wrestlers
American male professional wrestlers
American people of Jamaican descent
Professional wrestlers from Nebraska
Stampede Wrestling alumni
WWE Hall of Fame Legacy inductees
20th-century professional wrestlers
NWA Florida Tag Team Champions
NWA Brass Knuckles Champions (Florida version)
IWA World Heavyweight Champions (Australia)
IWA World Tag Team Champions (Australia)